Sheikh Dr. Ahmed Raïssouni (born 1953) is a Moroccan Islamic scholar and jurist. He served as president of the International Union of Muslim Scholars (IUMS) until his retirement in 2022.

Raïssouni is one of main figures in the Moroccan Sufi Islamic reform and revivalist movement started by Allal al-Fassi. Raïssouni retired from the IUMS in 2022 after stating that Mauritania's existence was "a mistake".

Early life and education 
Raïssouni was born in the village of Ouled Soltane, near Ksar el-Kebir. He finished his primary and secondary education in the Ksar el-Kebir, where he obtained a Baccalaureate in modern literature.

Raïssouni earned his bachelor's degree in Sharia from the University of al-Qarawiyyin in 1978. He completed his postgraduate studies at Mohammed V University, where he obtained a master's degree in 1989 and a doctorate in 1992. He was the first secretary-general of the Moroccan Association of Alumni in Greater Islamic Studies from 1992 to 1996.

Career

Raïssouni founded the Islamic Future Association (LAI) in 1994. He presided the MUR until his resignment in 2003. Raïssouni was the editor-in-chief of the daily newspaper Attajadid from 2000 until 2004.

The MUR is considered the ideological branch of the Islamist Justice and Development Party, and maintains close ties with the Muslim Brotherhood.

Raïssouni is a founding member of the International Union of Muslim Scholars (IUMS), he was a member of the union's executive board before being elected vice-president in 2013. He later became president of the IUMS from 2018 until his retirement in 2022.

Raïssouni is a senior expert at the International Islamic Fiqh Academy, and a visiting professor the Qatar Faculty of Islamic Studies. He is a former professor of Islamic jurisprudence and Sharia at Mohammed V University.

Controversy
Raïssouni is known for his controversial opinions, his criticism of the King's religious authority as Amir al-Mu'minin to issue fatwas led to his resignation from the position at MUR and Attajadid in 2004. He had also criticized the King's reforms to the family code in 2000. Raïssouni later moved to Doha, Qatar. Raïssouni was also critical of Abdesslam Yassine and the Al Adl Wa Al Ihssane movement.

In 2012, he condemned prosternation and kissing of the King's hands under royal protocol. In 2015, he stated that French is a "dying language" in Morocco and called the teaching of French in Morocco "everything but nationalistic". The same year, Raïssouni stated that abortion should be only permitted to "get rid of future abortion rights activists" as it would "rid society of their struggles". In 2017, he entered the terrorist watchlist of Saudi Arabia, Egypt, Bahrain, and the United Arab Emirates due to his ties with Qatar. In 2019, he claimed that homosexuality and premarital sex were "strong campaigns launched by organizations and countries to threaten the stability of families" and that homosexuals "benefit from the goodwill of the United Nations and the West", he added that premarital sex was "a phenomenon and a calamity orchestrated by social media and organizations".

On August 2, 2022, during an interview with Blanca TV, Raïssouni stated that Mauritania's existence is "a mistake", claiming that Mauritania "was an integral part of Morocco", and suggests Morocco should "recover its historical borders", he added that Moroccans were "ready to give everything, and march to Tindouf [Algeria], if the King calls for that". On his site, Raïssouni said that his statements were "misunderstood", that he was talking from a "historical view", and invited "every Moroccan [...] to visit their brothers in Tindouf".

The Association of Muslim Ulemas of Algeria froze its membership to International Union of Muslim Scholars following his remarks, and urged Raïssouni to resign. The Mauritanian Parliamentary Group for Moroccan Friendship said these Raïssouni's remarks "heavily offended" Mauritania, and that they are "against the simplest values ​​of brotherhood, dignity and neighborliness", the parliamentary group urged Raïssouni to "apologize to the two brotherly peoples for offending them, damaging the official efforts in fraternal relations in bilateral and regional cooperation". The Mauritanian National Rally for Reform and Development demanded that Raïssouni "withdraws these statements immediately and apologize".

Mohamed Melainine Ould Eyih, a Mauritanian government spokesman, stated that Raïssouni's remarks lacked "credibility and wisdom, and goes against historical and geographical evidence".

The International Union of Muslim Scholars stated that "[Raïssouni] has the right to express a personal opinion with full respect and appreciation for himself and others, but this is not the opinion of the union".

On August 28, 2022, Raïssouni announced his retirement and resigned from presidency at the International Union of Muslim Scholars, he stated that his retirement was to "exercise my freedom of expression, without conditions, compromises or pressure, standing firmly to my positions and opinions".

Personal life 
Raïssouni is married and has five children. Raïssouni is the brother of Soulaimane Raïssouni, and is the uncle of Hajar Raïssouni.

Books 
Raïssouni has published a number of scholarly works, mostly surrounding the topics of Islamic Jurisprudence (Fiqh) and its foundations, Maqasid Al Shari'ah, and Islamic governance. Among the books he has written are:

References

External links 

 Ahmed Raissouni's official site

1953 births
20th-century Muslim scholars of Islam
Moroccan Sunni Muslim scholars of Islam
Living people
Raissouni
Mohammed V University alumni
International Union of Muslim Scholars members
20th-century Moroccan people
21st-century Moroccan people